IFK Örebro is a Swedish football club located in Örebro.

Background
Idrottsföreningen Kamraterna Örebro were founded in 1900 and are Närke's second oldest sports club. Many of Örebro's clubs have had their roots with IFK Örebro. The Örebro Sports Klub (ÖSK), Örebro Atletklubb and boxing club, Kelly, were all formed after severing their ties with IFK Örebro. In addition to football the club also has an active handball section.

Since their foundation IFK Örebro has participated mainly in the middle and lower divisions of the Swedish football league system.  The club currently plays in Division 3 Västra Svealand which is the fifth tier of Swedish football. IFK Örebro have played three seasons in Division 2, in 1933/34, 1935/36 and 1936/37, which at that time was the second tier of Swedish football. They play their home matches at the Brickebackens IP in Örebro.

IFK Örebro are affiliated to Örebro Läns Fotbollförbund.

Recent history
In recent seasons IFK Örebro have competed in the following divisions:

2018	Division IV, Örebro Län
2017	Division IV, Örebro Län
2016	Division IV, Örebro Län
2015	Division IV, Örebro Län
2014	Division IV, Örebro Län
2013	Division IV, Örebro Län
2012	Division IV, Örebro Län
2011	Division III, Västra Svealand
2010	Division III, Västra Svealand
2009	Division III, Västra Svealand
2008	Division III, Västra Svealand
2007	Division IV, Örebro Län
2006	Division III, Västra Svealand
2005	Division IV, Örebro Län
2004	Division IV, Örebro Län
2003	Division IV, Örebro Län
2002	Division IV, Örebro Län
2001	Division IV, Örebro Län
2000	Division V, Örebro Län
1999	Division V, Örebro Län

Attendances

In recent seasons IFK Örebro have had the following average attendances:

Footnotes

External links
 IFK Örebro – Official website

Football clubs in Örebro County
Association football clubs established in 1900
1900 establishments in Sweden
Idrottsföreningen Kamraterna
Swedish handball clubs